was a village located in Kamiminochi District, Nagano Prefecture, Japan.

As of 2003, the village had an estimated population of 2,742 and a population density of 82.37 persons per km². The total area was 33.29 km². This village lies about 20 km west of Nagano City along route 19. Its landscape is surrounded by dense forests and mountains.  

On January 1, 2010, Nakajō, along with the town of Shinshūshinmachi (also from Kamiminochi District), was merged into the expanded city of Nagano.

The village's landmark, Mt. Mushikura (虫倉山), is the centerpiece of local lore.

References

External links 
Nakajō homepage 
Nagano official website 

Dissolved municipalities of Nagano Prefecture
Nagano (city)